Li Yining (22 November 1930 – 27 February 2023) was a Chinese economist. He was a leading voice for the privatization of state-owned companies, and his advocacy led to the reestablishment of China's stock exchanges in 1990. Along with Yu Guangyuan and Wu Jinglian, Li was credited with providing the theoretical basis for the market-oriented reform that has propelled China's economic growth.

Li was a long-time professor at Peking University and founding dean of the Guanghua School of Management. Amongst his former students were Chinese Premier Li Keqiang and Vice President Li Yuanchao. In 2004 Li Yining was awarded the Fukuoka Asian Culture Prize of Japan.

Li died in Beijing in February 2023, at age 92.

Early life
Li Yining was born 22 November 1930 in Nanjing, Jiangsu province, but is considered a native of his ancestral home Yizheng by Chinese convention. He was raised in Shanghai and Hunan province. In 1951, he entered the Economics Department of Peking University, where he studied under prominent economists such as Chen Daisun (陈岱孙) and Luo Zhiru, and was hired as a faculty member after graduating in 1955. However, only two years later he was labeled as a "rightist" when Mao Zedong launched the Anti-Rightist Movement, and during the Cultural Revolution (1966–76) he was again persecuted for his ideas and banished to a rural village where he performed manual labour for six years.

Reform era
After his political rehabilitation in 1978, Li Yining became a bold proponent of Deng Xiaoping's fledgling policy of economic reform. He insisted that the key first step of reform should be to privatize state-owned companies by introducing a shareholding system. However, the prevailing opinion among the reformers at the time was to first loosen price control. Li Yining unsuccessfully argued that ownership reform would initiate accountability for profits or losses and create a driving force for development, whereas price reform would only create a competitive environment for companies. For this theory he became known as "Mr. Stock Market Li". Li's vocal advocacy for the reform of state ownership, the bedrock of China's socialism, was supported by Yu Guangyuan 于光远 and Dong Furen 董辅礽, but met strong resistance from conservatives and exposed himself to significant political risk. In 1983 and 1984, his ideas were attacked as spiritual pollution and he could not have his articles published; in early 1987 he was again criticized in a campaign against "bourgeois liberalization".

Li Yining's theory was vindicated in 1988, when premature price liberalization resulted in severe inflation and social instability that endangered the entire reform process. In the early 1990s, the shareholding system that Li had been advocating was implemented by the central government of China. Shanghai Stock Exchange and Shenzhen Stock Exchange were established in 1990, and many state-owned companies have since become publicly traded. Li's economic theory is believed to be an important contribution to China's stunning economic growth that ensued. In 2004 Li was awarded the Academic Prize of the Fukuoka Asian Culture Prize by the Japanese city of Fukuoka, and in 2009 he was awarded a prize for innovation in economic theory by the Chinese government.

Academics
Li Yining has spent his entire academic career at his alma mater Peking University. He formerly served as the dean of the Guanghua School of Management, the university's business school, and later was professor and dean emeritus of the school. In the late 1980s and early 1990s, he was the doctoral advisor of Li Keqiang and the advisor for the master thesis of Li Yuanchao. They co-authored the book Strategic Choices for Prosperity. In 2013 Li Keqiang became the Premier of China and Li Yuanchao became the Vice President. His other students include Lu Hao, Governor of Heilongjiang province and a former Vice Mayor of Beijing, Meng Xiaosu, CEO of China Real Estate Development Group, and Gong Fangxiong, CEO of JPMorgan Chase Bank China Region.

Major publications
 Economics of Education, 1984
 System, Objective, and Human: Challenges Faced by Economics, 1986
 Political Economy of Socialism, 1986
 Management of the National Economy, 1988 (revised 1998)
 Ideas on China's Economic Reform, 1989
 Disequilibrium of Chinese Economy, 1990 (reprinted 1998)
 China's Economic Reform and Share-holding System, 1992
 Share-holding System and Modern Market Economy, 1994
 Development Theory of Transformation, 1996
 Transcending Market and Transcending Government: The Role of Moral Power in Economy, 1999
 The Origin of Capitalism: Comparative Studies of Economic History, 2003
 Li Yining's Collection of Lectures at Peking University, 2003
 The Strategic Choice for China's Prosperity (English version), 2018, with Meng Xiaosu, Li Yuanchao and Li Keqiang. Translated from Chinese by Shi Guangjun and Jiang Hongxing. .

Source: Fukuoka Prize.

References

1930 births
2023 deaths
Nanyang Model High School alumni
Peking University alumni
Academic staff of Peking University
People's Republic of China economists
Writers from Nanjing
Educators from Nanjing
Victims of the Cultural Revolution
Economists from Jiangsu
Members of the China Democratic League
Members of the Standing Committee of the 7th National People's Congress
Members of the Standing Committee of the 8th National People's Congress
Members of the Standing Committee of the 9th National People's Congress
Members of the Standing Committee of the 10th Chinese People's Political Consultative Conference
Members of the Standing Committee of the 11th Chinese People's Political Consultative Conference
Members of the Standing Committee of the 12th Chinese People's Political Consultative Conference
20th-century Chinese economists